The 1980 NCAA Division I-A football season saw a university from the state of Georgia take its first national title since 1942.

Nine days following the bowl games to close the 1979 season, tragedy struck when new LSU coach Bo Rein died when the plane he was flying in crashed into the Atlantic Ocean off the coast of Virginia. Rein, who coached North Carolina State to the Atlantic Coast Conference championship in 1979, was named on November 30 of that year as the successor to Charles McClendon, who coached LSU to a 137–59–7 mark from 1962 through 1979. Jerry Stovall, a former LSU All-American and St. Louis Cardinals defensive back, was named to succeed Rein approximately 36 hours after the crash.

The Georgia Bulldogs starred freshman running back Herschel Walker, who made his NCAA debut against Tennessee.  Down 15–2 at halftime, Georgia sent in Walker, the third string running back at the time, to try to light a spark.  Walker ran over All-American safety Bill Bates, in a play that would set the tempo for the rest of his career.

This year was the final season in which long time rivals Rutgers and Princeton played against each other. The rivalry between the New Jersey schools has not been played since.

This year's edition of Florida–Georgia game was won on a last minute 92 yard pass from Georgia's own endzone, known by the play by play call "Run, Lindsay, run!".

The Bulldogs ran through the rest of the season unscathed, beating Notre Dame in the Sugar Bowl.  Walker rushed for 150 yards against Notre Dame, a defense which had not given up a hundred-yard game that whole season. He did this with a dislocated shoulder.

The Pittsburgh Panthers also had a stellar season, led by defensive end Hugh Green.  The team went 11–1 and finished ranked No. 2, finishing the season with a rout of South Carolina and Heisman Trophy winner George Rogers in the Gator Bowl. 29 players from this team went on to play in the NFL.

Florida State defeated No. 3 ranked Nebraska on the Cornhuskers' home turf, and the following week defeated the No. 2 ranked Pitt Panthers

It was an unusual year for the Pac-10 as 5 of its 10 members were placed on probation by the conference (but not the NCAA) including traditional powers USC and UCLA, along with both Oregon schools and Arizona State. So half the conference was ineligible for bowl games and it was feared that the 4th or 5th-place finisher would end up in the Rose Bowl. Ironically,  USC and UCLA both got as high as No. 2 in the polls before being upset. As it turned out, the probation didn't matter as Washington won the conference outright with a 6–1 record.

This year's edition of the Holiday Bowl was a classic as the BYU staged a fourth quarter comeback, led by future NFL star Jim McMahon. Down 45–25 to SMU with less than four minutes left, McMahon threw three touchdown passes, including a Hail Mary as time expired, caught in the endzone by Clay Brown, despite being surrounded by three SMU defenders.

Rules changes
Offensive linemen are permitted full arm extension on so-called "retreat" blocking during pass plays, and clenched hands are permitted.
The "chop block" (a second offensive player blocking a defensive player below the knees while engaged with another offensive player) is outlawed.
A tie-breaker system was proposed for the post-season (similar to the one adopted for the 1995 post-season, except the start of overtime was at the 15–yard line and no defensive scores allowed), but failed to gain acceptance by the bowls.
Facemasking now includes grabbing the helmet as well as the facemask.

Conference and program changes

September

Most of the top teams of 1979 were expected to have strong seasons again in 1980. The preseason AP Poll had a top five of No. 1 Ohio State, No. 2 Alabama, No, 3 Pittsburgh, No. 4 USC, and No. 5 Oklahoma, all of whom had finished undefeated or with one loss the previous year. Georgia, which had gone just 6-5 in 1979, started at No. 16.

September 6: No. 2 Alabama was the first top-five team to begin its schedule, winning 26-3 over Georgia Tech. The other teams at the top of the poll had not begun their seasons; the next poll changed only slightly, with No. 1 Ohio State, No. 2 Alabama, No. 3 Pittsburgh, No. 4 Oklahoma, and No. 5 USC.

September 13: No. 1 Ohio State hosted Syracuse and won 31-21. No. 2 Alabama was idle. No. 3 Pittsburgh defeated Boston College 14-6, No. 4 Oklahoma beat Kentucky 29-7, and No. 5 USC won 20-17 at Tennessee. The AP voters shuffled the teams around somewhat: No. 1 Alabama, No. 2 Ohio State, No. 3 Oklahoma, No. 4 USC, and No. 5 Pittsburgh.

September 20: No. 1 Alabama defeated Mississippi 59-35 in a game arranged independently from the official SEC schedule. No. 2 Ohio State shut out Minnesota 47-0. No. 3 Oklahoma was idle. No. 4 USC won 23-13 over No. 20 South Carolina. No. 5 Pittsburgh defeated Kansas 18-3, but still fell out of the top five. No. 6 Nebraska impressed the voters with a 57-0 blowout of Iowa and moved up several spots in the next poll: No. 1 Alabama, No. 2 Ohio State, No. 3 Nebraska, No. 4 Oklahoma, and No. 5 USC.

September 27: No. 1 Alabama blanked Vanderbilt 41-0. No. 2 Ohio State won 38-21 over No. 20 Arizona State. No. 3 Nebraska visited No. 11 Penn State and came away with a 21-7 victory. The first of the top teams to lose was No. 4 Oklahoma, which fell 31-14 at home to John Elway and Stanford. No. 5 USC won 24-7 at Minnesota. No. 7 Texas shut out Oregon State 35-0 and moved into the top five in the next poll: No. 1 Alabama, No. 2 Ohio State, No. 3 Nebraska, No. 4 USC, and No. 5 Texas.

October

October 4: No. 1 Alabama recorded their second consecutive shutout, 45-0 over Kentucky, but the teams behind them were not as successful. No. 2 Ohio State was shut out at home by No. 11 UCLA, 17-0. No. 3 Nebraska was also upset at home, losing to No. 16 Florida State 18-14 on a fumble at the Seminoles’ three-yard line with 12 seconds left. No. 4 USC almost met a similar fate, but pulled out a 23-21 victory against Arizona State. No. 5 Texas won 41-28 at Rice. No. 6 Pittsburgh beat Maryland 38-9 and returned to the top five in the next poll: No. 1 Alabama, No. 2 USC, No. 3 Texas, No. 4 Pittsburgh, and No. 5 UCLA.

October 11: No. 1 Alabama had a surprisingly tough time with unheralded Rutgers, but the Tide prevailed 17-13. No. 2 USC won 27-10 at Arizona. No. 3 Texas met No. 12 Oklahoma in the Red River Shootout and dealt the Sooners another loss, 20-13. No. 4 Pittsburgh lost by a score of 36-22 to No. 11 Florida State, the Seminoles’ second consecutive win against a top-four opponent. No. 5 UCLA defeated No. 16 Stanford 35-21. No. 7 Notre Dame won 32–14 against No. 13 Miami. Three of the Irish’s four wins had been over ranked teams, and they moved up in the next poll: No. 1 Alabama, No. 2 USC, No. 3 Texas, No. 4 UCLA, and No. 5 Notre Dame.

October 18: No. 1 Alabama bounced back with another shutout win, 27-0 at Tennessee. No. 2 USC got bogged down in the rain at Oregon and had to settle for a 7–7 tie. No. 3 Texas and No. 4 UCLA were idle. No. 5 Notre Dame dominated Army 30-3. No. 6 Georgia, who had been slowly moving up in the poll with a mixture of narrow wins and blowouts (three of their six wins were by a touchdown or less, and the other three were by more than 30 points) defeated Vanderbilt 41-0 and moved up in the next poll: No. 1 Alabama, No. 2 Texas, No. 3 UCLA, No. 4 Notre Dame, and No. 5 Georgia.

October 25: No. 1 Alabama won 42-7 over No. 20 Southern Mississippi. No. 2 Texas fell to SMU by a score of 20–6, and the Longhorns would end up losing five of their last seven games after a 5-0 start. No. 3 UCLA defeated California 32-9 on the road. No. 4 Notre Dame won 20-3 at Arizona. No. 5 Georgia registered a second straight shutout by defeating Kentucky 27-0. No. 6 Florida State, whose only loss was by a single point to Miami, beat Memphis 24-3 to move into the top five: No. 1 Alabama, No. 2 UCLA, No. 3 Notre Dame, No. 4 Georgia, and No. 5 Florida State.

November

November 1: After five straight weeks with at least one major upset, this may have been the craziest day of all. No. 1 Alabama, which had held the top ranking for six weeks and was riding a 28-game winning streak, was knocked off by Mississippi State, 6-3; similar to the earlier Nebraska-Florida State game, the favored team lost on a late fumble at the three-yard line. No. 2 UCLA heard the news of Alabama’s loss, but the Bruins could not take advantage, falling 23-17 to Arizona in Tucson. No. 3 Notre Dame shut out Navy 33-0. No. 4 Georgia squeaked past No. 14 South Carolina 13-10 in a matchup between star running backs Herschel Walker and George Rogers. No. 5 Florida State crushed Tulsa 45-2, No. 7 USC blew California out 60-7, and No. 8 Nebraska defeated No. 15 Missouri 38-16. The next poll featured No. 1 Notre Dame, No. 2 Georgia, No. 3 Florida State, No. 4 USC, and No. 5 Nebraska.

November 8: The madness continued as new No. 1 Notre Dame was held to a 3-3 tie by Georgia Tech, who would finish with a 1-9-1 record. For the second week in a row, the second-ranked team struggled after being notified that the team above them had lost. No. 2 Georgia trailed rival No. 20 Florida late in the game when QB Buck Belue hit WR Lindsay Scott on an out pattern; Scott turned up field and went 90 yards for the winning score in the season's most memorable play. It was Scott's only touchdown reception all season and it gave the Bulldogs a 26-21 win, making them the only undefeated and untied team in the nation. The other top teams had less trouble. No. 3 Florida State defeated Virginia Tech 31-7, No. 4 USC won 34-9 at Stanford, No. 5 Nebraska beat Kansas State 55-8, and No. 6 Alabama won 28-7 over LSU. The next poll featured No. 1 Georgia, No. 2 USC, No. 3 Florida State, No. 4 Nebraska, and No. 5 Alabama.

November 15: No. 1 Georgia won 31-21 at Auburn, the first game of the season where their winning margin was more than 7 but less than 30; the victory clinched the SEC title and a Sugar Bowl berth for the Bulldogs. For the fifth week in a row, a top-two team suffered an upset, as No. 2 USC lost at home to Washington, 20-10, moving the Huskies into first place in the Pac-10. No. 3 Florida State was idle, beginning an unusual three-week layoff before their last game. No. 4 Nebraska shut out Iowa State 35-0. No. 6 Notre Dame went down to Birmingham and beat No. 5 Alabama 7-0. No. 7 Ohio State, who had started at the top of the poll and still had only one loss, beat Iowa 41-7 and finally returned to the top five: No. 1 Georgia, No. 2 Notre Dame, No. 3 Florida State, No. 4 Nebraska, and No. 5 Ohio State.

November 22: No. 1 Georgia and No. 3 Florida State were idle, while No. 2 Notre Dame won 24-10 over Air Force. No. 4 Nebraska and No. 9 Oklahoma met to decide the Big 8 title and the Orange Bowl berth, and for the second straight year the underdog Sooners narrowly upset the Cornhuskers (this time winning 21-17 on a touchdown with less than a minute to play). No. 5 Ohio State and No. 10 Michigan squared off in their usual showdown for the Big Ten championship, and once again the underdog won a close game, with the Wolverines prevailing 9-3. Michigan’s Rose Bowl opponent would be No. 16 Washington, who clinched the Pac-10 title with a 30-23 win over Washington State. No. 6 Pittsburgh and No. 7 Penn State were idle as they prepared for their rivalry game, but both teams moved into the top five after the Nebraska and Ohio State losses: No. 1 Georgia, No. 2 Notre Dame, No. 3 Florida State, No. 4 Pittsburgh, and No. 5 Penn State.

November 28-29: No. 1 Georgia completed their undefeated season with a 38-20 win over Georgia Tech. No. 2 Notre Dame and No. 3 Florida State were idle. No. 4 Pittsburgh faced No. 5 Penn State, and the Panthers’ defense led the way to a 14-9 victory. No. 6 Oklahoma had finished its season, but the Sooners moved up in the next poll: No. 1 Georgia, No. 2 Notre Dame, No. 3 Florida State, No. 4 Pittsburgh, and No. 5 Oklahoma.

December
December 6: The season ended with one final upset as No. 2 Notre Dame, whose only previous blemish was their tie against Georgia Tech, fell 20-3 to No. 17 USC. No. 3 Florida State, the only other highly-ranked team which hadn’t finished its schedule, defeated No. 19 Florida 17-13. No. 6 Michigan moved up one spot in the final regular-season poll: No. 1 Georgia, No. 2 Florida State, No. 3 Pittsburgh, No. 4 Oklahoma, and No. 5 Michigan. 

The major bowls extended their invitations in mid-November when there were still games left to be played, which led to problems for some of the top-ranked teams. Predicting that Notre Dame would defeat USC and finish undefeated, the Sugar Bowl organizers arranged for a meeting between the Fighting Irish and Georgia, which would have been a No. 1 vs. No. 2 showdown. The early invitation, combined with Notre Dame’s late-season loss, cost Florida State (the actual No. 2 team in the final poll) a chance to play in a de facto national championship game. The Seminoles ended up in an Orange Bowl rematch against Oklahoma, who had defeated them in the same event the previous year. 

The other unfortunate team was Pittsburgh, which was shut out of the New Year’s Day bowls despite a No. 3 ranking and a 10-1 record (their only loss being to Florida State). The Cotton Bowl organizers invited No. 9 Alabama to face No. 6 Baylor (who earned the automatic bid as the SWC champion) before the Panthers had obtained their resume-building win over Penn State. Since the Rose Bowl was contracted to feature the Big Ten and Pac-10 winners, the Panthers had to settle for a Gator Bowl bid against No. 18 South Carolina and Heisman Trophy winner George Rogers.

Conference standings

No. 1 and No. 2 Progress

Notable rivalry games

 Notre Dame 29, Michigan 27
 Rutgers 44, Princeton 13 (Final meeting)
 Michigan 9, Ohio State 3
 No. 9 Oklahoma 21, No. 5 Nebraska 17 
 UCLA 20, USC 17
Pitt 14, Penn State 9
 California 28, Stanford 23
 No. 1 Georgia 38, Georgia Tech 20
 LSU 24, Tulane 7
 USC 20, No. 2 Notre Dame 3

Bowl games
Sugar Bowl: No. 1 Georgia 17, No. 7 Notre Dame 10
Orange Bowl: No. 4 Oklahoma 18, No. 2 Florida State 17
Rose Bowl: No. 5 Michigan 23, No. 16 Washington 6
Cotton Bowl: No. 9 Alabama 30, No. 6 Baylor 2
Other Bowls
Gator Bowl: No. 3 Pittsburgh 37, No. 18 South Carolina 9
Sun Bowl: No. 8 Nebraska 31, No. 17 Mississippi State 17
Fiesta Bowl: No. 10 Penn State 31, No. 11 Ohio State 19
Peach Bowl: No. 20 Miami  20, Virginia Tech 10
Bluebonnet Bowl: No. 13 North Carolina 16, Texas 7
Liberty Bowl: Purdue 28, Missouri 25
Hall of Fame Classic: Arkansas 34, Tulane 15
Tangerine Bowl: Florida 35, Maryland 20
Holiday Bowl: No. 14 BYU 46, No. 19 SMU 45
Garden State Bowl: Houston 35, Navy 0
Independence Bowl: Southern Mississippi 16, McNeese State 14

Final AP and UPI rankings

Heisman Trophy voting
The Heisman Trophy is given to the year's most outstanding player

Source:

Other major awards
Maxwell - Hugh Green, DE, Pittsburgh
Outland – Mark May, OT, Pittsburgh
Camp - Hugh Green, DE, Pittsburgh
Lombardi - Hugh Green, DE, Pittsburgh

References